Vlado Ivanov (born 15 July 1993) is a Bulgarian footballer who plays as a midfielder.

References

External links

1993 births
Living people
Bulgarian footballers
PFC CSKA Sofia players
Akademik Sofia players
FC Chavdar Etropole players
FC Botev Vratsa players
PFC Lokomotiv Mezdra players
First Professional Football League (Bulgaria) players
Association football midfielders